The 1956–57 Chicago Black Hawks season was the team's 31st season in the NHL, and the club was coming off their third consecutive last place finish in the league in 1955–56, as they had a 19–39–12 record, earning 50 points.  The struggling Black Hawks had finished in last eight times in the past ten seasons, and only one playoff appearance since 1946.

On October 1, the Hawks announced that head coach Dick Irvin resigned as head coach of the club due to ill health.  Irvin was suffering from bone cancer and had been ill for the past two years, and was hospitalized in Montreal.  Tommy Ivan took over for Irvin.  On May 15, 1957, Dick Irvin died at the age of 64.

The Black Hawks got off to a miserable start to the season, as they had a 2–12–1 record in their first 15 games, and sat in last place in the league.  The team could never overcome their bad start, and slumped all season long, finishing the year with a 16–39–15 record, earning 47 points, and finishing in last place for the fourth straight season, and the ninth time in eleven years.

Offensively, Chicago was led by Ed Litzenberger, who led the club in goals with 32, and assists with 32, recording 64 points, which was good for fifth in the NHL.  His 32 goals was the team's highest total since 1943–44.  Johnny Wilson had a solid year, scoring 18 goals and 48 points, while Glen Skov also cracked the 40 point barrier, as he earned 42 points.  Jack McIntyre led the defense with 18 goals and 32 points, while fellow defenceman and team captain Gus Mortson had 5 goals, 23 points, and a team high 147 penalty minutes.

In goal, Al Rollins had all the playing time, winning 16 games, while posting a 3.20 GAA, and recording 3 shutouts.

Season standings

Record vs. opponents

Game log

Regular season

Season stats

Scoring leaders

Goaltending

References

Sources
 Hockey-Reference
 National Hockey League Guide & Record Book 2007

Chicago Blackhawks seasons
Chicago
Chicago